A Star Wars role-playing game is a role-playing game or role-playing video game set in the fictional Star Wars universe.

Tabletop role-playing games
 Star Wars: The Roleplaying Game, by West End Games (1987–1999)
 Star Wars Roleplaying Game, by Wizards of the Coast (2000–2010)
 Star Wars Roleplaying Game, initially by Fantasy Flight Games (2012–2020), and now by Edge Studio (2020–present) after parent company Asmodee moved the Star Wars Roleplaying Game license

Role-playing video games
 Star Wars: Knights of the Old Republic (Xbox, PC, Mobile, Android, Switch) (by BioWare)
 Star Wars: Knights of the Old Republic II - The Sith Lords (Xbox, PC, Mobile, Android, Switch) (by Obsidian Entertainment)

Massively multiplayer online role-playing games (MMORPGs)
 Star Wars: Galaxies (PC) (by LucasArts)
 Star Wars: Galaxies: Jump to Lightspeed—Expansion
 Star Wars Galaxies: Episode III Rage of the Wookiees—Expansion
 Star Wars Galaxies: Trials of Obi-Wan—Expansion
 Star Wars: The Old Republic (PC) (by BioWare)
 Star Wars Combine

References